"I Have a Little Dreidel" (also known as "The Dreidel Song" or "Dreidel, Dreidel, Dreidel") is a children's Hanukkah song in the English-speaking world that also exists in a Yiddish version called "Ikh Bin A Kleyner Dreydl", (Yiddish:  Lit: I am a little dreidel ). The song is about making a dreidel and playing with it.

History
The lyrics for the English version were written by Samuel S. Grossman and the composer of the English version is listed as Samuel E. Goldfarb (also S. E. Goldfarb). The song was written in 1927. The Yiddish version was both written and composed by Mikhl Gelbart, albeit under the name of Ben Arn, a pseudonym referring to himself as the son of Aaron.) There is a question about who composed this music since the melody for both the Yiddish and the English versions are precisely the same. The United Synagogue of Conservative Judaism (formerly known as The United Synagogue of America) is believed to be the first to publish the song in a collection of songs with its first printing in 1950 of the book, The Songs We Sing by Harry Coopersmith. The writers of the song in English only translated the original Yiddish version which was considered a folk song with the lyrics written by Mikhl Gelbart. Most believe that neither Goldfarb nor Grossman actually copyrighted the song and it was not included in Goldfarb's own printed book of songs because of this fact.

The meaning of the lyrics to the Yiddish and English versions is largely the same. However, in the original Yiddish version, the singer is referring to his or herself as the dreidel -- a four-sided spinning top -- made out of "blai", which translates to lead. In the English version, the lyrics refer to the singer having a dreidel made out of clay.

Versions

See also
 Hanukkah
 Hanukkah music
 Passover songs
 Jewish music
 Ma'oz Tsur

References 

English children's songs
Hanukkah music
Jewish songs
Yiddish-language songs
Year of song unknown